Pyon Yong-tae or Byeon Yeong-tae (December 15, 1892 – March 10, 1969) was a South Korean politician. He was the fifth prime minister of South Korea, and also served as Minister of Foreign Affairs.

References

External links 

 Interview on Longines Chronoscope (December 19, 1952)

Prime Ministers of South Korea
1892 births
1969 deaths
Foreign ministers of South Korea
Chogye Byeon clan